List of largest extinct lizards which are members of the order Squamata.

List

Geckos (Gekkota) 

A extinct member of family Diplodactylidae, Kawekaweau or Delcourt's giant gecko (Hoplodactylus delcourti), the largest gecko of all time. It had a snout-vent length of 37 cm (14.6 in), a total length of 60 cm (23.6 in). and a mass of  The modern representative of same genus is Duvaucel's gecko (Hoplodactylus duvaucelii) also has a large sizes (see list of largest extant lizards).
Some members of genus Phelsuma are one of the largest extant geckos (see list of largest extant lizards). Although, in the past, day geckos were even more larger. For example, the Rodrigues day gecko (Phelsuma edwardnewtoni) had total length up to 23 cm (9.1 in). The Rodrigues giant day gecko (Phelsuma gigas) was the largest day gecko and second-largest of all geckos (after the kawekaweau), with a length of up to 40 cm (15.74 in) and possibly even 44 cm (17.3 in), and body mass 193.43 g (6.8 oz).

Iguanas (Iguanidae) 

Another very large extinct iguanid, reached even larger – Lapitiguana impensa which had a length of 1.5 m (4.91 ft).

True lizards (Lacertidae) 

Marine lizards (Mosasauridae) 

Skinks (Scincidae) 

Monitor lizards (Varanidae) 

The prehistoric Australian megalania (Varanus priscus), which may have existed up to 40,000 years ago, is the largest varanid and the largest terrestrial lizard known to exist, but the lack of a complete skeleton has resulted in a wide range of size estimates.
Ever species fossil Saniwa measured  .
Palaeosaniwa was roughly comparable to a large monitor lizard (Varanidae) in size. Asprosaurus may compete with Palaeosaniwa in size.

See also
 Largest prehistoric animals

References

Lists of reptiles
Lizards
Lists of largest animals